The Pontiac Strato-Streak was a show car built by Pontiac for the 1954 General Motors Motorama. Based on the Star Chief's underpinnings, it had a 124-inch wheelbase and was only 54.7 inches high. The Strato-Streak was designed as a fiberglass 4-door hardtop, with four swivel bucket seats for easier entry, no center "B" pillar and the 4-door sedan opened from the center outwards. 

The interior was done in beige leather and gold metallic nylon. It was initially finished in metallic green, but was repainted iridescent metallic red and renamed the Strato Streak II. The "Strato-Streak" name was later used on Pontiac's all-new small block overhead-valve V-8 engines from 1955–1957. The concept car was used to introduce the all-new Pontiac V8 engine and introduce a Space Race inspired marketing approach.

References 

Pontiac concept vehicles
Cars introduced in 1954